Paban Das Baul (born 1961) is a noted Baul singer and musician from India, who also plays a dubki, a small tambourine and sometimes an ektara as an accompaniment. He is known for pioneering traditional Baul music on the international music scene and for establishing a genre of folk-fusion music.

Early life
Born in Mohammedpur, a small village in the Murshidabad district of West Bengal, where his early musical influences were his father, and wandering baul singers.

Career

In 1988, Das Baul started collaborating with Sam Mills, a London-born guitarist who had performed with experimental, avant garde group 23 Skidoo between 1979 and 1982. Their collaboration resulted in the acclaimed album Real Sugar (1997), a Peter Gabriel's Real World Records release, it marked one of the first fusions of Bengali music and Western pop music. He has also collaborated with the London-based State of Bengal and Susheela Raman. In 2005, the Baul tradition was included in the list of "Masterpieces of the Oral and Intangible Heritage of Humanity" by UNESCO.

He also performed at the Jaipur Literature Festival and the "Nine Lives" Concert, 2009 in London, of William Dalrymple.

Personal life
He met Mimlu as a concert audience in 1982 in Paris, they later married and lived in Paris for many years. He has taught himself to read, not just Bengali, but Hindi, English and French.

Discography
Solo albums
Inner Knowledge (1997)
Music of the Honey Gatherers (2010)

Collaboration albums
Real Sugar (1997, with Sam Mills)
Le Chant Des Bauls - Manuche O Rautan (2002, with various artists)
Tana Tani (2004, with State of Bengal)

Filmography
 Nagmoti (1983) (as performer at song "Doriyay Ailo Tufan")
 Shukno Lanka (2010) (as performer at song "Sundori Komola")
 Hunger & Love: Tobu O Bhalobasha (2017) (as composer)

Further reading

References

External links

Paban Das Baul at last.fm

Indian male folk singers
1961 births
Living people
People from Murshidabad district
Real World Records artists
Bengali singers
Bengali musicians
Musicians from West Bengal